Raju Gari Gadhi or also known as RGG, is a series of Indian Telugu-language comedy horror films created and directed by Ohmkar. Except the first film Raju Gari Gadhi (2015), the other two films Raju Gari Gadhi 2 (2017) and Raju Gari Gadhi 3 (2019) are remakes of Pretham (2016) and Dhilluku Dhuddu 2 (2019). 

Ashwin Babu played the character "Ashwin" in all the films, is the only common actor to appear in every film of the series. Upon the release of Raju Gari Gadhi (2015), the film received mixed reviews but it was commercially successful. This made director Ohmkar to continue the film series.

Films

Raju Gari Gadhi/RGG 1 

The film is jointly produced by  Varahi Chalana Chitram, AK Entertainments Pvt. Ltd and OAK Entertainments Pvt. Ltd. The film received mixed reviews but it was commercially successful. The film revolves around TV channel plan to host a reality show in a haunted house near Nandigama. Dead bodies of 34 people have resurfaced there for over a period of time. Seven individuals namely, Ashwin (Ashwin Babu), Nandu (Chethan Cheenu), Barbie (Eshanya), Bala Tripura Sundari (Dhanya Balakrishna), Shivudu (Dhanraj), M Y Danam (Shankar) and Bujjimma (Vidyullekha Raman) are selected for the show. Program head Pakoddi (Prabhas Sreenu) and Chekodi (Raghu Babu) have arranged all kinds of scares for the contestants. The rest of the story revolves about what incidents, the individuals face as the show progress and find the truth of that hanuted house.

Raju Gari Gadhi 2/RGG 2 

It is the remake of the 2016 Malayalam film Pretham. Although the film received negative reviews, it is commercially successful. The film features three friends – Ashwin (Ashwin Babu), Kishore (Vennela Kishore), and Praveen (Praveen), who are friends from college days, deciding to lead a life by investing in a resort business. As they start the business, everything goes smoothly until they begin to witness paranormal activities in the resort, making their lives tougher. Immediately, they contact a nearby Church Father (Naresh), but it fails miserably, and their fear of that ghost increases. The Father suggests them to approach a world-renowned mentalist named Rudra (Nagarjuna Akkineni) who has parlor tricks and more. Rudra decides to solve out the mystery in the resort. Beyond a shadow of the doubt, he finds out that it is a soul of a girl Amrutha (Samantha Akkineni), who is seeking answers for her death. Rudra ensures Amrutha that he will definitely help her. So, she starts revealing her past.

Raju Gari Gadhi 3/ RGG3 

It is the remake of 2019 Tamil film Dhilluku Dhuddu 2. This film too received mixed reviews. Ashwin (Ashwin Babu) and his maternal uncle (Ali) are happy-go-lucky guys who create a nuisance for their neighbours due to their drunken antics. The neighbours try out different methods to escape their antics, but in vain. One of the neighbours, who is a doctor by profession, comes across Maya (Avika Gor), whom he is in love with. However, when he tries to express his love, he is beaten black and blue by a mysterious ghost. After finding out details about Maya and the ghost, the doctor and other neighbours plot against Ashwin to make him fall in love with Maya and let the ghost take care of him. Injured in a fight, Ashwin, seeking a physiotherapist's help, and him falling in love with Maya was engineered by his neighbours. Things take a twist, and Ashwin is thrashed by the ghost. He finds out that Maya's father Garudaraja Bhattadhri is a powerful magician in Kerala and that he had set the ghost to protect Maya. He sets out to Kerala to convince Maya's father, along with his uncle. They insult Bhattadhri, and he sets out to do a pooja to harm them. To escape that, they ask for Chakra Mahadevi's help. It turns out that both Bhattadhri and Mahadevi are fake and that there is a real ghost protecting Maya. They go to a black magician, where he reveals the flashback about the ghost. The rest of the story revolves around how they solve the problem.

Cast

Raju Gari Gadhi 

 Ashwin Babu as Ashwin
 Chethan Cheenu as Dr. Nandan / Nandu
 Dhanya Balakrishna as Bala Tripura Sundari / Bala
 Dhanraj as Shivudu
 Rajiv Kanakala as Dr. Karthik
 Posani Krishna Murali as Bommali Raja
 Saptagiri as "Race Gurram" Babji
 Shakalaka Shankar as M Y Danam
 Poorna as Bommali
 Vidyullekha Raman as Bujjimma
 Eshanya Maheshwari as Barbie
 Raghu Babu as Chekodi
 Prabhas Sreenu as Pakoddi
 Jeeva

Raju Gari Gadhi 2 

 Ashwin Babu as Ashwin
 Nagarjuna Akkineni as Rudra
 Samantha Ruth Prabhu as Amrutha
 Seerat Kapoor as Suhanisa
 Abhinaya as Kiran
 Rao Ramesh as Parandhamaiah
 Vennela Kishore as Kishore
 Praveen as Praveen
 Vidyullekha Raman as Bellam Sridevi
 Naresh as Father
 Avinash as Priest
 Devan as Vice Chancellor Chandra Shekar
 Nandu as Nandu
 Tejaswi Madivada as Bala
 Narayana Rao as Master
 Annapurna as Varalakshmi
 Satya Krishnan as Lecturer
 Mukhtar Khan as Commissioner Sarathchandra
 Ravi Varma as Satti
 Shakalaka Shankar as Bala Yesu
 Geetha Singh as Nimmy
 Baby Lasya as Amrutha (child)
 Shatru as a goon

Raju Gari Gadhi 3 

 Ashwin Babu as Ashwin
 Avika Gor as Maya
 Urvashi as Rajamatha
 Ali
 Brahmaji
 Ajay Ghosh as Garudaraja Bhattadhri
 Prabhas Sreenu
 Hari Teja
 K. Sivasankar
 Dhanraj
 Getup Srinu
 Sneha Gupta - Item Girl 1 (" Naa Gadhiloki Ra ")
 Radhika S Mayadev - Item Girl 2 ( " Naa Gadhiloki Ra")

Crew

Release and revenue

References 

Indian film series
Horror film series
Indian comedy horror films
Indian horror films